Ataxia spinicauda is a species of beetle in the family Cerambycidae. It was described by Schaeffer in 1904. It is known from the Bahamas, Cuba, Jamaica and the United States.

References

Ataxia (beetle)
Beetles described in 1904